JSA may refer to:

Jaisalmer Airport (IATA Code)
Japan Shogi Association
Japan Sumo Association
The Japanese School of Amsterdam
Japanese Standards Association
JavaScript for Automaton, a scripting language for macOS
Job Safety Analysis
Job Services Australia
Jobseeker's Allowance in the United Kingdom 
Joint sales agreement
Joint Security Area between South and North Korea
Joint Security Area (film), a 2000 South Korean film
Joseph Smith Academy, a campus of Brigham Young University once located in Nauvoo, Illinois
Junior State of America, a student run political debate organization
Justice Society of America, a DC Comics superhero team
Jsa, a blood antigen
Jefferson Science Associates, the non-profit managing and operating contractor of the Thomas Jefferson National Accelerator Facility